Alyosha (an affectionate diminutive of Aleksey) is an  tall reinforced concrete statue of a Soviet soldier on Bunarjik Hill in Plovdiv, Bulgaria. The statue tops a  pedestal lined with granite. The memorial commemorates Soviet casualties incurred during the Soviet occupation of Bulgaria (which had been an Axis ally) in World War II. It was installed in 1954-57.

"Alyosha" is also the name of Konstantin Vanshenkin and Eduard Kolmanovski's song that was adopted as Plovdiv's official anthem until 1989. A well-known poem about the Plovdiv Soldier was written by Robert Rozhdestvensky.

Plovdiv authorities sought to have the statue removed on at least two occasions, in 1989 and 1996. The 1989 decision led to a preservation campaign which included a guard by the statue day and night in order to prevent it from being demolished.

Alyosha Skurlatov, a soldier of the 3rd Ukrainian Front who served as the model for this statue, died in 2013 at the age of 91.

References

Notes

Buildings and structures in Plovdiv
Outdoor sculptures
World War II memorials
Monuments and memorials in Bulgaria
Buildings and structures completed in 1957
Culture in Plovdiv
Bulgaria–Soviet Union relations
Outdoor structures in Bulgaria
Sculptures in Bulgaria